Cincotta is an Italian surname. Its country of highest prevalence is not Italy but the United States, with significantly smaller populations in Italy, Argentina and Australia.

Notable people
 Gale Cincotta (1929-2001), American activist 
 George A. Cincotta (1914-1985), American politician 
 Stefano Cincotta (born 1991), Guatemalan footballer
 Theodore Cincotta (born 1976), better known as Theo Logian

See also
 Cincotta (disambiguation)

References